Marty Lee Hoenes is an American rock musician who is best known as the lead guitarist for the Donnie Iris and the Cruisers. He is also a freelance artist and designer, having designed many of the band's albums.  He currently resides in North Canton, Ohio with his wife and daughter.

References

External links
Designs by Marty Lee Hoenes

Living people
American rock guitarists
American male guitarists
Donnie Iris and the Cruisers members
Musicians from Pittsburgh
Guitarists from Pennsylvania
People from North Canton, Ohio
Guitarists from Ohio
Year of birth missing (living people)